"Down with the Clique" is a song recorded by American singer Aaliyah for her debut studio album Age Ain't Nothing but a Number (1994). It was written and produced by R. Kelly. The song was released as the fourth single from Age Ain't Nothing but a Number exclusively in the United Kingdom on May 1, 1995, by Blackground Records and Jive Records.

"Down with the Clique" was met with mixed reviews from music critics, who praised Aaliyah's vocal delivery on the song but dismissed its lyrical content. A moderate commercial success, the song peaked at number 33 on the UK Singles Chart, becoming Aaliyah's fourth consecutive top-40 single in the United Kingdom.

Recording and production
While recording "Down with the Clique", Aaliyah developed an interest in producing, and she watched and helped R. Kelly develop the song. She said: "When we were recording 'Down With the Clique', I watched how Robert [Kelly] laid the drums and everything. He taught me to play the piano a bit, and I'm also trying to learn the mixing board, though it looks complicated. The studio is my first love."

Music and lyrics
"Down with the Clique" is a hip hop-influenced song on which Aaliyah displays a "silky cooing" with her vocals. Lyrically, the song sees her committing to a "junior-gangsta persona" with lines such as "Well now I guess it's time for me to wreck shop". In February 1995, British producers Mafia & Fluxy produced a reggae remix of the song.

Critical reception
Kenneth Partridge from Billboard gave "Down with the Clique" a mixed review, saying Aaliyah sounded unnatural singing lines such as "I guess it's time for me to wreck shop" and that the song was too much like an R. Kelly song, but described Aaliyah's performance as "adorable". Bianca Gracie from Fuse felt that Aaliyah was embodying an "effortless swagger that guys twice her age could only dream of having", also praising Aaliyah's "mellow" and "deep" vocal performance. Nakita Rathod from HotNewHipHop mentioned that despite the controversy surrounding Aaliyah's debut album, she was still able to be a young, free teenager with songs like "Down with the Clique". MTV.com felt that "Down With The Clique" was one of the album's highlights, along with "At Your Best (You Are Love)," "Young Nation," and "Age Ain't Nothing But A Number". In a review for Age Ain't Nothing but a Number, Tonya Pendleton from The Washington Post praised the production of the song by saying: "Kelly's hip-hop inserts provide a funky contrast that carries over to "Throw Your Hands Up" and "Down With the Clique", all paeans to the fun-loving good times of adolescence".

Commercial performance
"Down with the Clique" was released as the fourth UK single from Age Ain't Nothing but a Number. It peaked at number 33 on the UK Singles Chart dated May 13, 1995. The song also peaked at number five on the UK R&B Singles Chart, and at number 25 on the UK Dance Singles Chart, both on May 7.

Track listings and formats
UK 12-inch vinyl
 "Down with the Clique" (Madhouse Mix Radio Edit I) – 3:10
 "Down with the Clique" (Madhouse Mix) (instrumental) – 3:13
 "Down with the Clique" (Dancehall Mix) – 3:30
 "Down with the Clique" (Madhouse Mix Radio Edit II) – 3:28

UK maxi CD single
 "Down with the Clique" (Madhouse Mix Radio Edit I) (no chat) – 3:01
 "Down with the Clique" (album version) – 3:24
 "Down with the Clique" (Dancehall Mix) – 3:30
 "Down with the Clique" (Madhouse Mix Radio Edit II) – 3:28
 "Down with the Clique" (Madhouse Mix) (instrumental) – 3:13

Charts

Release history

References

1994 songs
1995 singles
Aaliyah songs
Songs written by R. Kelly
Song recordings produced by R. Kelly
Blackground Records singles
Reggae fusion songs